The Bigerhorn (3,626 m) is a mountain of the Swiss Pennine Alps, located south of Grächen in the canton of Valais. It lies in the Mischabel range, north of the Ried Glacier.

From the Bordier Hut, a trail leads to the summit of the Bigerhorn.

References

External links
 Bigerhorn on Hikr

Mountains of the Alps
Alpine three-thousanders
Mountains of Valais
Mountains of Switzerland